Percy Jones (26 December 1892 – 25 December 1922) was a Welsh professional boxing world champion who competed from 1911 to 1916. He became the first Welshman to win a World championship when he took the IBU flyweight title from Bill Ladbury in 1914. The IBU later became the EBU and that is why the achievement was taken into context when comparing fighters of the same era. Jones also took the British and European flyweight titles from Ladbury in the same match. He has been voted number 6 in a BBC poll of Welsh boxing greats.

History
Born in Porth and raised in a coal mining family, Jones made his name at a local level, fighting in boxing booths.

His first significant professional fight was a win (via disqualification) over Joe Symonds in March 1913. He beat Symonds twice more later that year, and in November stopped Sam Kellar in the fifteenth round in a final eliminator for the vacant British flyweight title. This led to a challenge in January 1914 for Bill Ladbury's title, Jones winning on points to be recognised as champion of Britain, Europe, and the World.

He lost to Eugene Criqui in his next (non-title) fight, but beat the Frenchman on points in April in a defence of his European title. In his next non-title bout, he was knocked out Symonds in the eighteenth round of twenty.

He was forced to relinquish the British and World titles after failing to make the weight in two title fights. He lost to Tancy Lee in October 1914 in what should have been a British title fight, prompting a move up to bantamweight.

His last professional contest was a fifth-round KO of Ladbury in October 1915, although he competed in an army contest the following year.

World War I interrupted his boxing career with Jones enlisting in the Glamorgan Bantam Battalion of the Welsh Army Service Corps on 2 January 1915. He was serving as a sergeant at the Somme in the Royal Welsh Fusiliers when he was badly wounded in the leg in 1916. After almost 30 operations to save the leg it was eventually amputated in 1918. Jones was also badly affected by poison gas.

His weight dropped to a little over 4 stone, and he died of trench fever in 1922 on Christmas Day, one day short of his 30th birthday.

Fight record
Jones is recorded on Boxrec.com as having 56 professional fights, with 50 wins, 3 losses and 3 draws.

Professional boxing record

See also
 List of Welsh boxing world champions
 List of British flyweight boxing champions

References

Sources

johnnyowen.com

External links
Fight Record
 Retrieved on 13 January 2010

|-

1892 births
1922 deaths
Welsh male boxers
Welsh amputees
Royal Welch Fusiliers soldiers
British Army personnel of World War I
World boxing champions
Flyweight boxers
People from Porth
Sportspeople from Rhondda Cynon Taf
European Boxing Union champions
Welsh military personnel